Dominique Ndjeng (born 4 November 1980) is a German former footballer who played as a defender. He also holds Cameroonian citizenship. His brother Marcel Ndjeng is also a professional footballer.

References

External links
 

Living people
1980 births
Sportspeople from Bonn
German people of Cameroonian descent
Cameroonian people of German descent
German sportspeople of African descent
Association football defenders
German footballers
1. FC Köln II players
Rot Weiss Ahlen players
VfL Osnabrück players
TuS Koblenz players
SC Preußen Münster players
SC Fortuna Köln players
Expatriate footballers in Germany
2. Bundesliga players
3. Liga players
Footballers from North Rhine-Westphalia